Hatgachha (Bengali: হাটগাছা) is a village in Sandeshkhali II Development Block in Basirhat subdivision of North 24 Parganas district in the Indian state of West Bengal.

Geography
Hatgachha, North 24 Parganas is located at

Demographics
As per the 2011 Census of India, Hatgachha had a total population of 5,980, of which 3,080 (52%) were males and 2,880 (48%) were females. Population below 6 years was 607. The total number of literates in Hatgachha was 3,962 (74.10% of the population over 6 years).

Transport
Lebukhali, around 14 km south of Hingalganj, was, in 2014, the last point up to which bus services were available. For travelling towards the Sundarbans one has to use ferry services (not available every day) or boats. From Hatgachha one can travel by road to Bhanderkhali nearby and then get a ferry service from Bhanderkhali ferry ghat to Lebukhali ferry ghat,

Education
Hatgacha KC Amritamayee High School is a co-educational higher secondary school.

References

Villages in North 24 Parganas district